"Cyanide" is a song by American heavy metal band Metallica, the third single taken from their ninth studio album, Death Magnetic. On September 1, 2008, it was made available for streaming on the band's official website, as well as a download (for Platinum Members only) from the Death Magnetic website Mission: Metallica. It has since been made available for purchase as a digital single in the iTunes Store.

The song was played live for the first time on August 9, 2008 at Ozzfest in Dallas, Texas, and was the first song from Death Magnetic to be performed live in its entirety. An audio recording of the performance is featured on the band's MySpace page. The song was also performed live on Later... with Jools Holland in 2008.

Track listing

Personnel
Metallica
 James Hetfield – vocals, rhythm guitar
 Lars Ulrich – drums
 Kirk Hammett – lead guitar
 Robert Trujillo – bass

Production
 Rick Rubin – producer
 Ted Jensen – mastering
 Greg Fidelman – mixing

Chart performance
In March 2009, "Cyanide" became Metallica's seventh number-one hit on the Billboard Mainstream Rock chart. It is their second consecutive number one on the chart from Death Magnetic, making the album only the band's second to spawn two number-one hits on the chart (1996's Load being the first). It is also the band's fifth top twenty hit on the Billboard Modern Rock chart, peaking at No. 19. The song peaked at No. 50 on the Billboard Hot 100 due to being released as a digital single prior to Death Magnetic's release.

"Cyanide" has been successful worldwide as well, reaching the top twenty in Canada, Finland, Norway, and Sweden, and the top fifty in Australia, the UK, and Ireland.

Charts

See also
List of Billboard Mainstream Rock number-one songs of the 2000s

References

2008 singles
Metallica songs
2008 songs
Songs about suicide
Songs written by James Hetfield
Songs written by Lars Ulrich
Songs written by Kirk Hammett
Songs written by Robert Trujillo
Song recordings produced by Rick Rubin
Warner Records singles